The 2012 BRD Arad Challenger was a professional tennis tournament played on clay courts. It was the second edition of the tournament which was part of the 2012 ATP Challenger Tour. It took place in Arad, Romania between 2 and 8 July 2012.

Singles main draw entrants

Seeds

 1 Rankings are as of June 25, 2012.

Other entrants
The following players received wildcards into the singles main draw:
  Victor Crivoi
  Petru-Alexandru Luncanu
  Florin Mergea
  Constantin Sturdza

The following players received entry as an alternate into the singles main draw:
  Andrej Martin

The following players received entry from the qualifying draw:
  Toni Androić
  Marin Draganja
  Dino Marcan
  Boris Pašanski

Champions

Singles

 Facundo Bagnis def.  Victor Hănescu, 6–4, 6–4

Doubles

 Nikola Mektić /  Antonio Veić def.  Marin Draganja /  Dino Marcan, 7–6(7–5), 4–6, [10–3]

External links
Official Website

BRD Arad Challenger
BRD Arad Challenger
2012 in Romanian tennis